The Department of Field Support (DFS) was a department of the United Nations dedicated to the support of peacekeeping field missions and political field missions. Following the UN Secretary-general's management reform, it ceased to exist on 31 December 2018. In January 2019, the new Department of Operational Support was created.

Area of responsibility
United Nations General Assembly report A/64/633 (26 January 2010) states the following about the DFS' role:

Organization
The Department of Field Support was headed by Mr. Atul Khare from 2 March 2015 to 31 December 2018, following the departure of Under-Secretary-General Ms. Ameerah Haq. The department has four main divisions:
Field Personnel Division
Field Budget and Finance Division
Logistics Support Division
Information & Communications Technology Division
It also runs bases in UN Global Service Center (UNGSC) in Brindisi (UNLB) and Valencia (UNSBV), as well as Regional Service Center in Entebbe (RSCE).

Founded in 2010, the UN Global Service Center's mandate is to "ensure efficient and effective peace operations through the core logistics, geospatial, information and telecommunications technology services it provides."

Founded in 2010 as part of the Global Field Support Strategy (GFSS) in UNGA Resolution 64/269, the Regional Service Center in Entebbe's mandate is to "transform service delivery to field missions through a fundamental shift in the existing division of labor and a relocation of functions to improve responsiveness and address the needs of the field missions."

Personnel
Field Service Officers are civilians assigned to support UN peacekeeping and political missions in the field. DFS provides support in the areas of security, finance, administration, human resources, logistics and technology.

History of the DFS
The origins of the Field Service go back to the beginning of the history of the UN's peacekeeping operations in 1948 when the Security Council authorized the deployment of UN military observers to the Middle East. The mission's role was to monitor the Armistice Agreement between Israel and its Arab neighbours – an operation which became known as the United Nations Truce Supervision Organization (UNTSO). The office was created in 2007 to provide dedicated support to peacekeeping field missions and political field missions.

See also
United Nations Peacekeeping
United Nations Department of Peacekeeping Operations
List of United Nations Peacekeeping Missions

References

External links
 UNGA Resolution 64/269 at undocs.org
 UNGA Report A/64/633 at undocs.org

United Nations organizations based in North America